Armando Barriguete (born 7 May 1901, date of death unknown) was a Mexican equestrian. He competed in the individual eventing at the 1932 Summer Olympics.

References

External links
 

1901 births
Year of death missing
Mexican male equestrians
Olympic equestrians of Mexico
Equestrians at the 1932 Summer Olympics
Place of birth missing